Pigmented hairy epidermal nevus syndrome is a cutaneous condition characterized by a Becker nevus, ipsilateral hypoplasia of the breast, and skeletal defects such as scoliosis.

See also 
 Epidermal nevus syndrome
 Skin lesion
 List of cutaneous conditions

References 

 
Epidermal nevi, neoplasms, and cysts
Syndromes